Stetson Fleming Bennett IV (born October 28, 1997) is an American football quarterback who played for the Georgia Bulldogs and Jones County Bobcats. Nicknamed "the  Mailman", he started his career as a walk-on at Georgia before transferring to Jones County Junior College. Bennett transferred back to Georgia, which won consecutive national championships in 2022 and 2023.

Early life and high school  
Bennett was born on October 28, 1997, in Atlanta, Georgia. In first grade, his family moved from Atlanta to Nahunta, Georgia. In eighth grade, his family moved to Blackshear, Georgia, where he played high school football at Pierce County High School. There, he led the school to three consecutive state playoff appearances, throwing for 3,724 yards, running for 500 more and scoring 40 total touchdowns as a senior.

College career

Georgia
Bennett was a walk-on at Georgia his freshman season.

He did not take a snap the whole season. After five-star high school quarterback Justin Fields committed to Georgia in 2018, Bennett decided to transfer to Jones County Junior College.

Jones County Junior College
After his transfer, Bennett played in 12 games and threw for 16 touchdowns and 1,840 yards. After his lone season at Jones County he entered the transfer portal for a second time. He was a three-star prospect heading into his transfer. He was about to join the Louisiana Ragin' Cajuns, but he ended up returning to Georgia. The Bulldogs were in need of a backup quarterback after Fields transferred to Ohio State. Georgia offered Bennett a scholarship. He accepted and became Georgia's second-string quarterback.

Georgia (second stint)
As Jake Fromm's backup, Bennett had two touchdowns and one interception on the season. He also had one rushing touchdown. He most notably appeared in the SEC Championship Game when Fromm went down with an injury.

Heading into his junior season, Bennett started the season as a backup quarterback to D'Wan Mathis. Mathis was named the starter after Jamie Newman, the planned starter, opted out of the season. Bennett became the starter after poor play from Mathis. A few months later, USC transfer JT Daniels took the starting job. Bennett appeared in eight games, of which he played significant time in six of them. He finished with 1,179	passing yards, eight passing touchdowns, and six interceptions to go along with two rushing touchdowns.

2021 
Bennett began the season as the backup to JT Daniels. He made his first appearance and first start of the 2021 season against the UAB Blazers after Daniels went down with an oblique injury. In that game, Bennett tied the record for most touchdowns in a game by a Georgia quarterback, with five. Bennett was trusted with the starting job for the rest of the season, and he led the Bulldogs to a 12–0 record. He finished the season with 29 touchdowns and seven interceptions.

On December 4, 2021, Bennett threw for three touchdowns and two interceptions in the 41–24 loss in the SEC Championship Game against the Alabama Crimson Tide. He was criticized for the loss, leading many to believe that JT Daniels should get the start against Michigan in the Orange Bowl. Bennett remained the starter and helped lead the Bulldogs to a victory over Michigan. In the 34–11 victory, Bennett passed for 313 yards and three touchdowns. Bennett led the Bulldogs to a victory in the 2022 College Football Playoff National Championship game in a rematch against Alabama to give Georgia their first national title since 1980. Bennett passed for 224 yards and two touchdowns in the 33–18 victory.

2022 

On January 20, 2022, just ten days after winning the National Championship and amid speculation that he would transfer, Bennett announced his return to Georgia. In the preseason, Adam Rittenberg named Bennett a Heisman Trophy candidate.

Bennett entered the season as the starter, and in the season opener against Oregon, he threw for a then career-high 368 yards while throwing and rushing for three total touchdowns in a 49–3 rout.After his performance, he was named the Walter Camp National Player of the Week and the Manning Award Quarterback of the Week.  The following week, Bennett threw for 300 yards, before being replaced in the third-quarter by backup Carson Beck, in a 33–0 victory. 

During the 2022 regular season, Bennett led Georgia to a 13–0 record, including an SEC Championship. During the 2022 SEC Championship Game, he passed for four touchdowns and 274 yards and was named the game's MVP in a 50–30 victory. Bennett finished the year with 20 passing touchdowns, 3,425 passing yards, six interceptions, and seven rushing touchdowns. On December 5, 2022, Bennett was named a finalist for the Heisman Trophy. Bennett and the Bulldogs remained #1 and faced up against C. J. Stroud and the #4 ranked Ohio State in the 2022 Peach Bowl. Bennett and the Bulldogs beat Ohio State with a score of 42–41 to advance to  the 2023 College Football Playoff National Championship for the second consecutive year.

On January 9, 2023, Bennett and the Bulldogs defeated the TCU Horned Frogs in the 2023 College Football Playoff National Championship, with a score of 65–7. He was named the offensive MVP of the game after combining for six total touchdowns. This tied him with Joe Burrow, for the most total touchdowns in a College Football Playoff National Championship Game. With the victory, Bennett led Georgia to the largest margin of victory in any bowl game at the FBS level and becoming just the third team in college football history to finish the season with a record of 15–0.

Bennett finished the season passing for 4,127 yards. With this mark, he surpassed the previous record for passing yards in a single season, set by Aaron Murray in 2012.

Statistics

Personal life 

Stetson Bennett IV is the son of Denise and Stetson Bennett III. His parents met at and graduated from the University of Georgia College of Pharmacy. Bennett is the grandson of Buddy Bennett, who played quarterback for the South Carolina Gamecocks from 1958 to 1960 and later was a coach.

On January 28, 2023, Bennett was arrested in Dallas, Texas on public intoxication charges after banging on doors in a residential area at 6 A.M.

References

External links
Georgia Bulldogs bio
https://sportsinterval.com/stetson-bennett-nfl-draft-2023/

1997 births
Living people
Players of American football from Atlanta
People from Blackshear, Georgia
American football quarterbacks
Georgia Bulldogs football players
Jones County Bobcats football players